Bill Berglund (born September 24, 1945 in Everett, Massachusetts) is an American former ice hockey goaltender who played five games in the World Hockey Association for the New England Whalers.

Biography 
Berglund played college hockey with Boston State College before turning spending one year in the United States Hockey League for the Green Bay Bobcats.  He turned pro in 1972 in the Eastern Hockey League with the New England Blades and the Rhode Island Eagles.  He also played in the Southern Hockey League for the Suncoast Suns and the American Hockey League for the Jacksonville Barons before making his debut for the Whalers in the 1973–74 WHA season, playing three games in all.  He played North American Hockey League for the Cape Codders before playing two more games for the Whalers during the 1974–75 WHA season which turned out to be his last pro season before retiring.

Berglund went on to become an assistant coach at both Northeastern University and Boston University. He also worked as a scout for the Montreal Canadiens.

References

External links

1945 births
Living people
American men's ice hockey goaltenders
Ice hockey players from Massachusetts
Montreal Canadiens scouts
New England Whalers players
Sportspeople from Everett, Massachusetts
Suncoast Suns (SHL) players
Boston State College alumni